Ethan Happ (born May 7, 1996) is an American professional basketball player for Rio Breogán of the Spanish Liga ACB. He is the all-time leading rebounder for the Wisconsin Badgers, where he started all 139 games of his college career and is the school record holder in double-doubles and triple-doubles. Happ is one of just six players in NCAA history to record at least 2,000 points, 1,000 rebounds and 400 assists. 

At a height of 2.08 m (6'10") tall, Happ plays at both the power forward and center positions.

High school career
Happ, whose hometown is Milan, Illinois, attended Rockridge High School, in Taylor Ridge, Illinois, where he played high school basketball.

College career
He attended the University of Wisconsin, where he played college basketball with the Wisconsin Badgers. Happ red-shirted during his freshman season, during which the Badgers were the 2015 NCAA runner-up.

Happ started every game in 2015–16 for the Badgers and was named Big Ten Freshman of the Year. He was also a unanimous selection the Big Ten All-Freshman Team and named to the Big Ten All-Defensive Team. He was selected to the third team All-Big Ten by the media and honorable mention by the coaches. As a sophomore, Happ became a greatly improved player. He was named a third-team All-American after averaging 14 points per game.

Despite not being listed in most mock drafts, Happ declared for the 2018 NBA draft without hiring an agent, giving him the option to return to college, which he later did.

On December 22, 2018, Happ grabbed his 1,000th career rebound in a win over Grambling State. On February 12, 2019 he scored his 2000th point, making him the first player in the Big Ten to score 2,000 points and collect 1,000 rebounds in 35 years. As a senior, Happ averaged 17.9 points, 10.3 rebounds, 4.6 assists, 1.0 steals and 1.2 blocks per game. Happ was the only player in NCAA during the 2018—19 season, to lead their respective team in all 5 statistical categories.

Professional career

Olympiacos (2019)  
After not being selected in the 2019 NBA draft, Happ signed with the Chicago Bulls, to play on their 2019 NBA Summer League team.

On July 18, 2019, Happ signed a two-year deal with the Greek EuroLeague club Olympiacos, of Piraeus, Greece, to play under head coach David Blatt.

Vanoli Cremona (2019–2020) 
After appearing in only one game with Olympiacos, Happ was loaned on November 5, 2019, to the Italian League club Vanoli Cremona, for the remainder of the 2019–20 season. On June 30, 2020, the Greek club officially announced that they had forfeited their contract option and Happ thus became a free agent. Happ averaged 18.3 points per game, 9.3 rebounds per game and 2.5 assists per game.

Fortitudo Bologna (2020–2021) 
Happ signed with Fortitudo Bologna of the Lega Basket Serie A on July 10, 2020. After suffering a left elbow injury, he was ruled out for three to four weeks on October 25.

Dinamo Sassari (2021)
At mid season, on January 18, 2021, Happ transferred from Fortitudo Bologna to Dinamo Sassari.

Riesen Ludwigsburg (2022) 
On January 8, 2022, Happ signed with MHP Riesen Ludwigsburg of the Basketball Bundesliga (BBL).

Río Breogán (2022–present) 
On July 8, 2022, Happ signed with Río Breogán of the Spanish Liga ACB.

College statistics

|-
| style="text-align:left;"| 2014–15
| style="text-align:left;"| Wisconsin
| colspan="11" style="text-align:center;" | Redshirt
|-
| style="text-align:left;"| 2015–16
| style="text-align:left;"| Wisconsin
| 35 || 35 || 28.1 || .538 || .000 || .643 || 7.9 || 1.3 || 1.8 || 0.9 || 12.4
|-
| style="text-align:left;"| 2016–17
| style="text-align:left;"| Wisconsin
| 37 || 37 || 27.8 || .586 || .000 || .500 || 9.0 || 2.8 || 1.8 || 1.2 || 14.0
|-
| style="text-align:left;"| 2017–18
| style="text-align:left;"| Wisconsin
| 33 || 33 || 30.8 || .528 || .091 || .550 || 8.0 || 3.7 || 1.5 || 1.1 || 17.9
|-
| style="text-align:left;"| 2018–19
| style="text-align:left;"| Wisconsin
| 28 || 28 || 32.4 || .540 || .000 || .441 || 10.3 || 4.6 || 1.0 || 1.2 || 17.9
|-
| style="text-align:left;"| Career
| style="text-align:left;"| 
| 133 || 133 || 29.6 || .548 || .063 || .540 || 8.7 || 3.0 || 1.6 || 1.1 || 15.4

Career honors and awards

College career 
2019 Second-team Consensus All-American (AP, NABC, SN, USBWA)
2019 Pete Newell Big Man Award
2019 Kareem Abdul-Jabbar Award
2018 First-Team All-Big Ten (media)
2017 Wooden Award Final Ballot
2017 Naismith Trophy Semifinalist
2017 Oscar Robertson Midseason Watch List
2017 Kareem Abdul-Jabbar Award Finalist
2017 Second-Team All-American (SI); Third Team All-American (USA Today, TSN)
2017 Big Ten Defensive Player of the Year (AP)
2017 First-Team All-Big Ten
2017 Big Ten All-Tournament Team
2016 Big Ten Freshman of the Year
2016 Third-Team All-Big Ten (media)
2016 Big Ten All-Freshman Team
2× USBWA All-District (2017, '18)
2× NABC All-District (2017 first team, 2018 second team)
2× Big Ten All-Defensive Team (2016, '17)
2× Big Ten Player of the Week

Personal life
Happ's parents are Randy and Teresa Happ. His father Randy, played college basketball at North Central College (Division III), and his brother Eric, played college basketball at Carl Sandburg College (Junior College). Happ is a first cousin of former MLB pitcher J. A. Happ. Happ had roots from Sicily through his great grandfather.

See also
List of NCAA Division I men's basketball players with 2,000 points and 1,000 rebounds

References

External links

Proballers Profile
Euroleague.net profile
Eurobasket.com profile
Italian League profile 
Wisconsin Badgers bio

1996 births
Living people
All-American college men's basketball players
American expatriate basketball people in Greece
American expatriate basketball people in Italy
American expatriate basketball people in Spain
American men's basketball players
Basketball players from Illinois
CB Breogán players
Centers (basketball)
Liga ACB players
Olympiacos B.C. players
People from Milan, Illinois
Power forwards (basketball)
Riesen Ludwigsburg players
Vanoli Cremona players
Wisconsin Badgers men's basketball players